Father Basilio's striped mouse or the Bioko hybomys (Hybomys basilii) is a species of rodent in the family Muridae.
It is found only in Equatorial Guinea.
Its natural habitat is subtropical or tropical moist montane forest.
It is threatened by habitat loss.

References

Hybomys
Rodents of Africa
Endemic fauna of Equatorial Guinea
Mammals described in 1965
Taxonomy articles created by Polbot